Christopher M. Smith (October 12, 1879 – October 4, 1949) was an American composer and popular vaudeville performer.

Biography 
Smith was born in Charleston, South Carolina. He started traveling with medicine shows when he was young and joined Vaudeville, where he performed with Elmer Bowman and Jimmy Durante.  He also wrote music for Bert Williams. Smith died in New York City on October 4, 1949.

Selected works 
Smith composed many songs, including the following:

 "Good Morning Carrie", lyrics by Cecil Mack (pseudonym of Richard Cecil McPherson), music by Smith & Euday L. Bowman; Windsor Music Co. (1901); 
 "Mandy, You and Me!" Smith and James H. Burris (né James Henry Burris; 1876–1923) (w&m); Attucks Publishing Company (©1905); 
 "Honky Tonky Monkey Rag" Words and Music by Chris Smith, 1911 
 "Junk Man Rag", lyrics by Smith & Ferdinand E. Mierisch, music by Charles Luckyth Roberts ("Luckey"); Jos. W. Stern & Co. (1913); 
 "Fifteen Cents", Words and Music by Chris Smith,  1913
 "Ballin' the Jack", lyrics by Jim Burris (né James Henry Burris; 1876–1923), music by Smith; Jos. W. Stern & Co. (1913); 
 "Never Let the Same Bee Sting You Twice", Cecil Mack (pseudonym of Richard Cecil McPherson), music by Smith; Broadway Music Corporation (1916); 
 "Down in Honky Tonk Town", music & lyrics by Smith & Charles R. McCarron (1891–1919); Broadway Music Corporation (1918); 
 "I've Got My Habits On", lyrics by Smith & Bob Schafer, music by Jimmie Durante; Goodman & Rose, Inc. (1921);  †
 "At the Honky-Tonk Steppers' Ball", lyrics & music by Smith & Jimmie Durante; Goodman & Rose, Inc. (1921);  †
 "The Camel Walk", lyrics by Cecil Mack & Bob Schafer; music by Smith & James Tim Brymn; Broadway Music Corporation (1925); 

Note
 † – Goodman & Rose, Inc., was a New York music publishing firm founded by Frank Goodman and Justus Rose

References

External links
 Chris Smith Biography by Tom Morgan
 
 Chris Smith recordings at the Discography of American Historical Recordings.
 Chris Smith recordings at the UCSB Cylinder Audio Archive.

1879 births
1949 deaths
20th-century American composers
20th-century American male actors
African-American composers
African-American male actors
African-American male composers
Vaudeville performers
20th-century American male musicians
20th-century African-American musicians